Brave New Jersey is a 2016 American comedy film directed by Jody Lambert, who also served as co-writer with Michael Dowling. The film stars Tony Hale, Anna Camp, Sam Jaeger, Heather Burns, Dan Bakkedahl and Raymond J. Barry. The film was released on August 4, 2017, by Gravitas Ventures. It takes place on the day/night of "The War of the Worlds" broadcast on October 30–31, 1938 and shows how a small New Jersey town reacts to what they thought was an impending alien invasion.

Cast  
Tony Hale as Clark Hill
Anna Camp as Peg Prickett
Sam Jaeger as Paul Davison
Heather Burns as Lorraine Davison
Dan Bakkedahl as Reverend Ray Rogers
Raymond J. Barry as Captain Ambrose P. Collins
Erika Alexander as Helen Holbrook
Mel Rodriguez as Sheriff Dandy
Evan Jonigkeit as Sparky
Grace Kaufman as Ann Davison
Matt Oberg as Chardy Edwards
Leonard Earl Howze as Stan Holbrook
Noah Lomax as Peter
Adina Galupa as Shannon
Jack Landry as Neighbor Del
Harp Sandman as Ziggy
Bill Coelius as Mac
Gabriel Landis as Jimmy
Patrick Miller as Mr. Pepper

Release
The film premiered at the Austin Film Festival on October 15, 2016. The film was released on August 4, 2017, by Gravitas Ventures.

References

External links
 

2016 films
2016 comedy films
American comedy films
Films set in New Jersey
Films set in 1938
2010s English-language films
2010s American films